23rd Street station may refer to:

New York City 
 23rd Street station (IRT Lexington Avenue Line), a subway station at Park Avenue South (4th Avenue) in Manhattan
 23rd Street station (BMT Broadway Line), a subway station at Broadway and Fifth Avenue in Manhattan
 23rd Street station (IND Sixth Avenue Line), a subway station at Sixth Avenue (Avenue of the Americas) in Manhattan
 23rd Street station (PATH), a subway station located within the IND Sixth Avenue Line station
 23rd Street station (IRT Broadway–Seventh Avenue Line), a subway station at Seventh Avenue in Manhattan
 23rd Street station (IND Eighth Avenue Line), a subway station at Eighth Avenue in Manhattan
 Court Square–23rd Street station, a subway station near One Court Square in Long Island City, Queens

Demolished Stations 
 23rd Street station (IRT Second Avenue Line), a demolished elevated station at Second Avenue in Manhattan
 23rd Street station (IRT Third Avenue Line), a demolished elevated station at Third Avenue in Manhattan
 23rd Street station (IRT Sixth Avenue Line), a demolished elevated station at Sixth Avenue in Manhattan
 23rd Street station (IRT Ninth Avenue Line), a demolished elevated station at Ninth Avenue in Manhattan

California 
 23rd Street station (Muni Metro), a light rail station in San Francisco
 23rd Street station (Sacramento), a light rail station in Sacramento
 LATTC/Ortho Institute station (formerly 23rd Street), a light rail station in Los Angeles

See also 
 23rd Street (disambiguation)